Hairat Aderinsola Balogun, née Alatishe, OON (born 1941) is a Nigerian lawyer, the first female Attorney General of Lagos State.

Life
Hairat Balogun was born on 10 October 1941, the daughter of a well-off Muslim cocoa buyer Alhaji Jinodu Alatishe (The Balogun Of Ijebuland). She travelled to the United Kingdom aged twelve, to attend secondary school there, before studying for the bar at Lincoln's Inn. She was called to the English bar, aged 21, on 5 February 1963, and to the Nigerian bar on 13 July 1963. In 1981 she was elected as the first Secretary-General of the Nigerian Bar Association, and held the office until 1983.

Hairat Balogun is a Life-Bencher, and was the first female Chairman of the Body of Benchers. She was also the first female member of the council of the International Bar Association. She is a Life Member of the International Federation of Women Lawyers (FIDA). She was made Officer of the Order of Niger for services rendered to the Nigerian legal profession.

In 2011 she published her legal memoirs. In 2012 she became the first female president of the Rotary Club of Lagos, and held the presidency until 2013. In 2016 she was recognized with an award in the Nigerian Legal Awards (NLA).

Works
 To Serve in Truth and Justice, 2011

References

1941 births
Living people
Nigerian women lawyers
Barristers and advocates
Officers of the Order of the Niger
Members of Lincoln's Inn
Judiciary of Lagos State